
Year 914 (CMXIV) was a common year starting on Saturday (link will display the full calendar) of the Julian calendar.

Events 
 By place 

 Byzantine Empire 
 Spring – Empress Zoe Karbonopsina leads a palace coup at Constantinople and, with the support of the magistros John Eladas, overthrows Patriarch Nicholas Mystikos as regent over her son, Emperor Constantine VII. She allows Nicholas to remain as patriarch, repudiates the title granted to Simeon I of Bulgaria (see 913) and nullifies the marriage plans (with a Bulgarian princess) made for her son by Nicholas.
 Summer – Byzantine–Bulgarian War: Simeon I, with the Bulgarian army, invades the themes of Thrace and Macedonia. Simultaneously, the Bulgarian troops penetrate into the regions of Dyrrhachium and Thessalonica to the west. Thrace's largest and most important city, Adrianople (modern Turkey), is besieged and captured. However, the Byzantines promptly regain the city in exchange for a huge ransom.

 Europe 

 January 19 – King García I dies at Zamora (Spain) after a 4-year reign. He is succeeded by his brother Ordoño II, who becomes king of Galicia and León. Ordoño continues his expansion and settles his court in León.
 Summer – Saracens from Garigliano establish advanced strongholds in Lazio at Trevi (in the Sabine Hills, near Palestrina) and Sutri. From here, they encroach on the papal cities of Orte, Narni and Nepi with impunity.
 Viking raiders establish a settlement near Waterford (Ireland) led by Ottir (the Black). The Dublin Vikings are forced to pay tribute to the Irish kings of Meath and Leinster as the price to keeping their independence.
 In Al-Andalus a drought leads to a terrible famine in the Iberian Peninsula, which continues in 915. In his centralization effort, the Umayyad caliph Abd al-Rahman III, reconquers Seville from the Banu Hajjaj clan.

 Britain 
 Vikings devastate the Welsh coast and move up the Severn River. They capture Bishop Cyfeilliog of Ergyng, but are driven out by Saxon levies from Hereford and Gloucester.
 Æthelflæd, Lady of the Mercians, a daughter of King Alfred the Great, builds a burh or fortified dwelling at Warwick and repairs Eddisbury hill fort. She leads the Mercians in their fight against the Danish invaders.

 Africa 
 January 24 – The Fatimid general, Hubasa ibn Yusuf of the Kutama Berber tribe, marches out with his troops to invade Egypt. He follows the coastline, and takes possession of the only two towns of any size Syrte and Ajdabiya, without a struggle. The garrisons of the two towns—the westernmost outposts of the Abbasid Caliphate—have already fled.
 February 6 – Hubasa takes Barqah (modern-day Benghazi), the ancient capital of Cyrenaica. The Abbasid governor withdraws to Egypt, before the superior strength of the Fatimids. With this rich, fertile province fallen into his hands, it provides Hubāsa with 24,000 gold dinars in annual revenues from taxes, as well as 15,000 dinars paid by Christians.
 July 11 – Al-Qa'im bi-Amr Allah, son of the Fatimid caliph Abdullah al-Mahdi Billah, leaves Raqqada at the head of an army, which is composed of Kutama warriors and the Arab jund (personal guard) in an attempt to conquer Egypt. He sends orders to Hubāsa to wait for him, but driven by ambition Hubāsa is already on his way to Alexandria.
 August 27 – Hubasa captures Alexandria, after a victorious encounter with Egyptian troops near al-Hanniyya (modern-day El Alamein). The Abbasid governor Takin al-Khazari refuses to surrender and asks for reinforcements, which reach him in September. Shortly after al-Qa'im bi-Amr Allah enters Alexandria, with the rest of his army.
 December – The Fatimid army under Hubasa leaves Alexandria, followed by al-Qa'im bi-Amr Allah. The Abbasid troops hold Fustat and begin a counter-offensive against the invaders. The Kutama cavalry suffers heavy losses to the Turkish archers.

 Arabian Empire 
 January 12 – Ahmad Samani, emir of the Samanid Empire, is murdered (decapitation) while sleeping in his tent at Bukhara (modern Uzbekistan) by some of his slaves. He is succeeded by his 8-year-old son, Nasr II, under the regency of Vizier Abu Abdallah al-Jayhani. The Abbasids try, in vain, to benefit from the turmoil to reconquer Sistan.
 Sajid invasion of Georgia: A Muslim army under Yusuf ibn Abi'l-Saj campaigns in the Georgian principalities. He makes Tiflis his base for operations, and invades Kakheti. Yusuf proceeds to Kartli, where the fortifications of Uplistsikhe are demolished. He besieges and captures the fortress of Q'ueli, putting its defender Gobron to death.
 Hasan al-Utrush re-establishes Zaydid rule over the province Tabaristan (Northern Iran), after 14 years of Samanid occupation. He becomes the new ruler (emir) and Zaydid noblemen accept his authority.

 Asia 
 February 4 – The Belanjong pillar is established on Bali.
 In India Emperor Indra III of the Rashtrakuta Dynasty, a grandson of Krishna II, begins his rule (until 929).

 By topic 

 Religion 
 March or April – Pope Lando dies at Rome after a reign of less than a year. He is succeeded by John X, archbishop of Ravenna, as the 122nd pope of the Catholic Church.

Births 
 Al-Muti, Abbasid caliph (d. 974)
 Chen Hongjin, Chinese warlord (d. 985)
 Li Conghou, emperor of Later Tang (d. 934)
 Luitgarde, duchess consort of Normandy (d. 978)
 Shi Chonggui, emperor of Later Jin (d. 974)
 Valtoke Gormsson, Viking nobleman (d. 985)

Deaths 
 January 12 – Ahmad Samani, Samanid emir 
 January 19 – García I, king of León (Spain)
 February 12 – Li, empress of Yan
 December 31 – Ibn Hawshab, founder of the Isma'ili community in Yemen
 Abu Sa'id al-Jannabi, founder of Bahrain (or 913)
 Aedh mac Ailell, abbot of Clonfert
 Bárid mac Oitir, Viking leader
 Gobron, Georgian military commander
 Idalguer, Frankish bishop
 John Eladas, Byzantine regent
 Krishna II, Indian ruler 
 Lando, pope of the Catholic Church
 Li Jihui, Chinese governor
 Liu Rengong, Chinese warlord
 Liu Shouguang, Chinese warlord
 Mu'nis al-Fahl, Abbasid general
 Plegmund, archbishop of Canterbury (or 923)

References